The Armed conflict for control of the favelas in Greater Rio de Janeiro is an ongoing continuous, since 2006, armed conflict between brazilian militias and subgroups, Primeiro Comando da Capital, Comando Vermelho, Amigos dos Amigos, Terceiro Comando Puro and the government.

According to law student Carlos Gilberto Martins Junior, Brazil, with emphasis for the State of Rio de Janeiro, there has been a arbitrary use of these powers and attributions, conferred on police institutions, to satisfy the patrimonial aspirations of some of its agents, through territorial domination and violence, to the detriment of the peripheral communities and under the pretext of saving them from the “greater evil” represented by drug trafficking, corroborating the emergence of criminals organizations what conventionally called the “militia”.

The conflict

The Brazilian pseudo-police militias emerged in the late 2000s, being composed mainly of off-duty police officers receiving assistance from local businessmen who needed protection from armed gangs. The Comando Vermelho, as a response, began carrying out terrorist attacks against civilian targets between the 27th and 31 December 2006, during these attacks, 19 people died, being 10 civilians, 2 policemen and 7 gang member. As retaliation, the pseudo-police conducted several raids against the Comando Vermelho, killing more than 100 gang members. The militias launched several attacks between January 2007 and March 2008 against the Comando Vermelho, conquering the "Cidade Alta" favela on February 4, three days later it was recaptured by the Comando Vermelho commanded by Gilberto Martins da Silva, alias "Mineiro da Cidade Alta". In the subsequent clashes 20 gang members were killed, during the same period, several families were expelled by militias from their homes and assaulted in the Palmeirinha favela, in Guadalupe, Piauí. The militias obtained a "Caveirão" (an armored vehicle used by the BOPE, Batalhão de Operações Policiais Especiais, and the Military Police of the State of Rio de Janeiro for high risk operations) in January of the same year. According to some investigations, the militias finance their armed struggle with illegal activities, such as extortion, kidnapping, usury, racketeering, robbery, human trafficking, pimping and arms trafficking In May 2008, the militias, commanded by Coronel Jairo, kidnapped and tortured a group of journalists from the Brazilian newspaper O Dia who were reporting the criminal activities perpetrated by the militiamen. After 7 hours of torture they were released. In that same month, in clashes between the Comando Vermelho and the militias 10 people were killed. Residents were threatened by the fighting groups and the president of an association for local residents was kidnapped and subsequently disappeared. On 5 August, Carlos Alexandre Silva Cavalcante, alias "Gaguinho", leader of a faction of the militias, was killed. On August 20, 2008, the militias carried out a massacre, which resulted in the death of 7 people in the "Carobinha" favela in a false flag operation aiming to frame the Comando Vermelho for the massacre, and to shift public opinion against the gang, there was also an attempt to enforce the political candidacy of Carminha Jerominho, daughter of Jerônimo Guimarães Filho, alias "Jerominho", the leader of a militia faction. On October 5, "Mineiro da Cidade Alta" was killed by the militias for the murder of several paramilitary soldiers.
From 2007 to 2008, three politicians were arrested for providing support to the militias: Josinaldo Francisco da Cruz, Natalino José Guimarães and the brother. On 9 June 2009, Josinaldo Francisco da Cruz was killed.
Despite claims from the militias, such as the "Escritório do Crime" militia faction, militias have allied themselves with criminal drug trafficking cartels like the TCP.

Police helicopter downed on Morro dos Macacos
The Morro dos Macacos is one of the most violent favelas in Rio de Janeiro, the community was invaded by CV on October 17, 2009, while it was also under the control of the ADA, who clashed with the Comando Vermelho to contend for territory, 5 gang members were killed in the clashes from 11 to 17 October.

In order to stop the clashes between the two groups, about 150 assault troops of the Special Operations Department of the Polícia Militar were dispatched for security purposes. In an attempt to prevent the intervention of the police in the ongoing feud, the criminals built makeshift barricades in several key points and subsequently set them on fire.

On the 17th of October, in the morning, the rear propeller of a Fenix ​​helicopter patrolling above the community was shot and severely damaged by drug traffickers of Amigos dos Amigos: according to some sources the weapons used in the attack were a bazooka and machine guns. The helicopter crashed, killing 2 soldiers on impact, with another soldier dying later. The attack sparked a massacre between police, militias and the drug cartels. The massacre went on from the 17th to the 25th of October 2009 and ended with a government victory, there were 45 deaths as a consequence.

During the massacre, brazilian authorities have admitted to corruption and brutality among the police force and the relise of two narcos perpetred by some policemen; confirming also the existence of the armed militias made up of off-duty police and firefighters who compete against drug traffickers for control of the drug market and the support of the government on them.

2010–present

After the battle, there were other several clashes between militiamen and gang members. Throughout the 2010s there were several arrests and convictions against militiamen and drug traffickers involved in the massacres. The militias managed to conquer several territories under control of the Comando Vermelho, although some of them later returned to the gang's control after being reconquered during clashes.  In November 2010, another massacre occurred between the militar police and the CV, resulting in the deaths of 41 people. On the 1st of February 2012, during a raid conducted by the Polícia Militar (PM), a "Caveirão" was destroyed by the Comando Vermelho in the favela of Jacarezinho, no injured were reported. During the course of the massacre, the CV and the militias began recruiting child soldiers.  On November 19, 2016, during an operation of the PM, a militar police helicopter was shot down by Comando Vermelho in the favela of Cidade de Deus, in the crash four policemen died. On February 9, 2020, a prominent militia faction leader, Adriano Magalhães da Nóbrega, also known as "Capitão Adriano" or "Gordinho", was seriously injured in a police operation and later died in a hospital. On October 15, in one of the deadliest operations against militias, the PM clash with a convoy of the militias killing 12 paramilitaries on Itaguaí, also a policeman was injured. In the Morro do Fubá favela, the residents were forced to pay a monthly fee of 50 brazilian reals as part of a protection racket. On May 17, 2022, militias attacked a civilian helicopter with rifles who was flying over the Rio area, no injuries were recorded but the helicopter suffered slight damage.
On August 20 of the same year, Delson Lima Neto, brother of one of the leader of the militias, Tandera Danilo Dias Lima, was killed alongside 3 paramilitaries soldiers by the Polícia Militar on Nova Iguaçu, in Baixada Fluminense, after his death the Comando Vermelho conquered the favela of Grão-Pará, in Nova Iguaçu. After the raid, on 23 August, the police found and seized an improvised fighting vehicle (similar to a Caveirão) used by the militias to fight against Comando Vermelho in Nova Iguaçu.

Timeline of massacres in the Greater Rio de Janeiro since the start of the conflict

References

External links 
 ACLED analysis

See also

Crime in Brazil
Primeiro Comando da Capital

Terrorism in Brazil
Organized crime conflicts in Brazil
Massacres in Brazil
Police brutality in Brazil